Deborah Elaine "Debra" Sapenter, later Speight-Christopher (born February 27, 1952), is an American athlete who competed mainly in the 400 meters. She was born in Prairie View, Texas. In 1975 she was rated as the number one 400 meter women's sprinter in the United States.  She competed for United States in the 1976 Summer Olympics, held in Montreal, in the 4 × 400 metres relay where she won the silver medal with her teammates Sheila Ingram, Pamela Jiles and Rosalyn Bryant.

After her running career Sapenter found a career in Information Technology holding Corporate Information Officer positions at Genuity, Harvard Pilgrim HealthCare / Harvard Vanguard, and Zürich Financial Group. In 1995 she was inducted into the Southwestern Athletic Conference Hall of Fame as Debra Sapenter-Speight.

References

External links
 

1952 births
Living people
People from Prairie View, Texas
American female sprinters
Athletes (track and field) at the 1975 Pan American Games
Athletes (track and field) at the 1976 Summer Olympics
Olympic silver medalists for the United States in track and field
Medalists at the 1976 Summer Olympics
Pan American Games medalists in athletics (track and field)
Pan American Games silver medalists for the United States
Medalists at the 1975 Pan American Games
Olympic female sprinters
21st-century American women